Thyatira bodemeyeri is a moth in the family Drepanidae. It was described by Otto Bang-Haas in 1934. It was described from Persia. It has golden and tan wings with a furry looking body and multiple light yellow dots on the wings.

References

Moths described in 1934
Thyatirinae
Taxa named by Otto Bang-Haas